Leo is an upcoming Indian Tamil-language gangster action film directed by Lokesh Kanagaraj, who co-wrote the script with Rathna Kumar and Deeraj Vaidy. It is produced by S. S. Lalit Kumar, under Seven Screen Studio, and co-produced by Jagadish Palanisamy. The film stars Vijay and Trisha, with an ensemble supporting cast.

The film was officially announced in January 2023 under the tentative title Thalapathy 67, marking Vijay's 67th film as a lead actor, and the title of the film was announced a few days later. Principal photography commenced the same month in Chennai along with a long schedule in Kashmir, where 40% to 45% of the film takes place. It is scheduled to conclude in May. The film has music composed by Anirudh Ravichander, cinematography handled by Manoj Paramahamsa and editing by Philomin Raj.

Leo is scheduled to be released in theatres worldwide on 19 October 2023.

Cast

Production

Development   
In early 2021, it was reported that Lokesh Kanagaraj would reunite with Vijay for a second film after Master (2021), after Lokesh's commitments on Vikram (2022), whereas Vijay would collaborate with Nelson for Beast (2022) and would subsequently sign Vamshi Paidipally's project, which would be later titled Varisu (2023). In March 2022, Lokesh confirmed that there were discussions for him to direct Vijay's 67th film. That May, he confirmed the project, tentatively titled Thalapathy 67.

The project was funded by S. S. Lalit Kumar's Seven Screen Studio, which had distributed and co-produced Master, while Vijay's manager, Jagadish serves as a co-producer. The company made a public announcement on 30 January 2023, confirming the project, and the film's official title was revealed as Leo on 3 February 2023. However, he reportedly decided to take the revenue sharing model, to benefit the film's production; as per the basis, he would receive  as an advance, and a chunk of the profits will be received as the actor's remuneration.

Pre-production 
Leo is reportedly based from an old script Lokesh wrote after Maanagaram (2017) that was being reworked for this project. It took him nearly six months for the writing and pre-production. Lokesh co-wrote the film's script along with Rathna Kumar in his third consecutive collaboration with the director, while Deeraj Vaidy, director of Jil Jung Juk (2016) also joined the writing team. Lokesh said the film would be completely made in his style, unlike Master which he considered a 50% Vijay film and 50% his film. A muhurat puja was held on 5 December 2022 at AVM Studios in Chennai with the film's cast and crew. On 7 December, the team shot the promotional video for the film for nearly three days.

In mid-January 2023, Manoj Paramahamsa was announced as cinematographer, marking his first collaboration with Lokesh and third with Vijay after Nanban (2012) and Beast. Anirudh Ravichander would score the music, in his third consecutive film with the director. Lokesh further retained most of his norm technicians including editor Philomin Raj, stunt choreography duo Anbariv, dance choreographer Dinesh Kumar and art director N. Sathees Kumar. Praveen Raja would style the costumes for Vijay, along with his regular costume designers Pallavi Singh and Eka Lakhani.

Casting 

Trisha was cast as the female lead, pairing opposite Vijay for the fifth time after Ghilli (2004), Thirupaachi (2005), Aathi (2006) and Kuruvi (2008). Bollywood actor Sanjay Dutt was confirmed to play one of the main antagonists, in his Tamil film debut as well as his second South Indian film after K.G.F: Chapter 2 (2022). Dutt agreed to be a part of the project, after being impressed by the one-line narrated for the film. Priya Anand also joined the film in an important role, whilst Arjun was also cast in an important role. He called it a "different" and "fresh" one that would justify his title "action king". Mysskin, Sandy Master, Gautham Vasudev Menon, and Mansoor Ali Khan would play prominent roles. Malayalam actor Mathew Thomas, would also make his Tamil debut with the film. All of their inclusion were confirmed by the production house in late-January 2023. Manobala and Janany Kunaseelan were present at the film's preliminary shooting, confirming their presence in the film; the latter would make her acting debut in a feature with this film. George Maryan was also featured in the muhurat puja, thereby confirming his inclusion. Abhirami Venkatachalam and Babu Antony were also confirmed after participating in the film's Kashmir schedule.

Filming 

Principal photography began with the first schedule on 2 January 2023 at EVP Film City in Chennai. Minor portions of the film were held at Kodaikanal in the last week of January. The second schedule commenced in Pahalgam, Kashmir on 1 February 2023 and will go on till late March. During this schedule, footage of Vijay was leaked and went viral, prompting the film's official technology security partner to warn people against sharing leaked content or they would be deleted. On 27 February 2023, Mysskin tweeted that he had completed filming his portions for the film, which included an intense stunt sequence. In early March, Menon announced that he had completed filming for the film. Manoj Paramahamsa brought a RED V-raptor XL camera to shoot significant portions of the film, a first for a Tamil film. Dutt had started filming for his portions on 11 March and completed his part in the Kashmir schedule on 17 March. Dutt will join the next schedule which will commence in Chennai in the second week of April, after he finishes his cameo role for Jawan. The subsequent schedule will be held in Chennai and rest of India thereafter and filming is expected to conclude in May. A huge massive airport set is reportedly being built in Ramoji Film City, Hyderabad, so that the team can film the climax action sequence. The team are reportedly going to film in Hyderabad for 20 days.

Post-production 
Post-production for the film will begin by late-May and early-June 2023, once the film completes its shooting and will go on for three months as the film involves extensive computer graphics and visual effects. Moving Picture Company will handle the visual effects, in their third Indian film after RRR and Bhediya (both 2022).

Music 
The soundtrack is composed by Anirudh Ravichander, in his fourth collaboration with Vijay after Kaththi (2014), Master and Beast; third collaboration with Lokesh after Master and Vikram. The track "Bloody Sweet" that was featured in the two-minute promo video was released on 3 February 2023, the same date as the promo. It had English lyrics written by Heisenberg, with Anirudh and Siddharth Basrur performing.

Release

Theatrical 
Leo is scheduled for a theatrical release on 19 October 2023. Apart from Tamil, it is expected to be released in dubbed versions including Telugu, Kannada and Hindi languages.

Pre-release business 

Home media 

References

External links 
 

Films directed by Lokesh Kanagaraj
Films scored by Anirudh Ravichander
Films shot in Chennai
Films shot in Jammu and Kashmir
Films shot in Kodaikanal
Indian action films
Indian gangster films
Upcoming films
Upcoming Tamil-language films